Fursac is a commune in the department of Creuse, central France. The municipality was established on 1 January 2017 by merger of the former communes of Saint-Étienne-de-Fursac (the seat) and Saint-Pierre-de-Fursac.

See also 
Communes of the Creuse department

References 

Communes of Creuse